Club Social y Deportivo Dorados de Sinaloa Premier was a professional football team that played in the Mexican Football League. They were playing in the Liga Premier Serie B. Club Social y Deportivo Dorados de Sinaloa Premier was affiliated with Dorados de Sinaloa who plays in the Ascenso MX.

Players

Current squad

References

Football clubs in Sinaloa
Liga Premier de México